Jeyran-e Sofla may refer to:
 Jeyran-e Sofla, East Azerbaijan
 Jeyran-e Sofla, West Azerbaijan